Scotland is internationally known for its traditional music, which remained vibrant throughout the 20th century and into the 21st, when many traditional forms worldwide lost popularity to pop music. In spite of emigration and a well-developed connection to music imported from the rest of Europe and the United States, the music of Scotland has kept many of its traditional aspects; indeed, it has itself influenced many forms of music.

Many outsiders associate Scottish folk music almost entirely with the Great Highland Bagpipe, which has long played an important part in Scottish music. Although this particular form of bagpipe developed exclusively in Scotland, it is not the only Scottish bagpipe.  The earliest mention of bagpipes in Scotland dates to the 15th century although they are believed to have been introduced to Britain by the Roman armies.  The pìob mhór, or Great Highland Bagpipe, was originally associated with both hereditary piping families and professional pipers to various clan chiefs; later, pipes were adopted for use in other venues, including military marching. Piping clans included the Clan Henderson, MacArthurs, MacDonalds, MacKays and, especially, the MacCrimmon, who were hereditary pipers to the Clan MacLeod.

Early music

Stringed instruments have been known in Scotland from at least the Iron Age. The first evidence of lyres were found in the Greco-Roman period on the Isle of Skye (dating from 2300 BCE), making it Europe's oldest surviving stringed instrument. Bards, who acted as musicians, but also as poets, story tellers, historians, genealogists and lawyers, relying on an oral tradition that stretched back generations, were found in Scotland as well as Wales and Ireland. Often accompanying themselves on the harp, they can also be seen in records of the Scottish courts throughout the medieval period. Scottish church music from the later Middle Ages was increasingly influenced by continental developments, with figures like 13th-century musical theorist Simon Tailler studying in Paris, before returning to Scotland where he introduced several reforms of church music. Scottish collections of music like the 13th-century 'Wolfenbüttel 677', which is associated with St Andrews, contain mostly French compositions, but with some distinctive local styles. The captivity of James I in England from 1406 to 1423, where he earned a reputation as a poet and composer, may have led him to take English and continental styles and musicians back to the Scottish court on his release. In the late 15th century a series of Scottish musicians trained in the Netherlands before returning home, including John Broune, Thomas Inglis and John Fety, the last of whom became master of the song school in Aberdeen and then Edinburgh, introducing the new five-fingered organ playing technique. In 1501 James IV refounded the Chapel Royal within Stirling Castle, with a new and enlarged choir and it became the focus of Scottish liturgical music. Burgundian and English influences were probably reinforced when Henry VII's daughter Margaret Tudor married James IV in 1503. James V (1512–42) was a major patron of music. A talented lute player, he introduced French chansons and consorts of viols to his court and was patron to composers such as David Peebles (c. 1510–1579?).

The Scottish Reformation, directly influenced by Calvinism, was generally opposed to church music, leading to the removal of organs and a growing emphasis on metrical psalms, including a setting by David Peebles commissioned by James Stewart, 1st Earl of Moray. The most important work in Scottish reformed music was probably A forme of Prayers published in Edinburgh in 1564. The return from France of James V's daughter, Mary, Queen of Scots in 1561, renewed the Scottish court as a centre of musical patronage and performance. The Queen played the lute, virginals and (unlike her father) was a fine singer. She brought many influences from the French court where she had been educated, employing lutenists and viol players in her household. Mary's position as a Catholic gave a new lease of life to the choir of the Scottish Chapel Royal in her reign, but the destruction of Scottish church organs meant that instrumentation to accompany the mass had to employ bands of musicians with trumpets, drums, fifes, bagpipes and tabors. The outstanding Scottish composer of the era was Robert Carver (c.1485–c.1570) whose works included the nineteen-part motet 'O Bone Jesu'. James VI, king of Scotland from 1567, was a major patron of the arts in general. He rebuilt the Chapel Royal at Stirling in 1594 and the choir was used for state occasions like the baptism of his son Henry. He followed the tradition of employing lutenists for his private entertainment, as did other members of his family. When he came south to take the throne of England in 1603 as James I, he removed one of the major sources of patronage in Scotland. The Scottish Chapel Royal was now used only for occasional state visits, as when Charles I returned in 1633 to be crowned, bringing many musicians from the English Chapel Royal for the service, and it began to fall into disrepair. From now on the court in Westminster would be the only major source of royal musical patronage.

Folk music

There is evidence that there was a flourishing culture of popular music in Scotland during the late Middle Ages, but the only song with a melody to survive from this period is the "Pleugh Song". After the Reformation, the secular popular tradition of music continued, despite attempts by the kirk, particularly in the Lowlands, to suppress dancing and events like penny weddings. This period saw the creation of the ceòl mór (the great music) of the bagpipe, which reflected its martial origins, with battle-tunes, marches, gatherings, salutes and laments. The Highlands in the early seventeenth century saw the development of piping families including the MacCrimmonds, MacArthurs, MacGregors and the Mackays of Gairloch. There is also evidence of adoption of the fiddle in the Highlands with Martin Martin noting in his A Description of the Western Isles of Scotland (1703) that he knew of 18 players in Lewis alone. Well-known musicians included the fiddler Pattie Birnie and the piper Habbie Simpson. This tradition continued into the nineteenth century, with major figures such as the fiddlers Neil and his son Nathaniel Gow. There is evidence of ballads from this period. Some may date back to the late Medieval era and deal with events and people that can be traced back as far as the thirteenth century. They remained an oral tradition until they were collected as folk songs in the eighteenth century.

The earliest printed collection of secular music comes from the seventeenth century. Collection began to gain momentum in the early eighteenth century and, as the kirk's opposition to music waned, there were a flood of publications including Allan Ramsay's verse compendium The Tea Table Miscellany (1723) and The Scots Musical Museum (1787 to 1803) by James Johnson and Robert Burns. From the late nineteenth century there was renewed interest in traditional music, which was more academic and political in intent. In Scotland collectors included the Reverend James Duncan and Gavin Greig. Major performers included James Scott Skinner. This revival began to have a major impact on classical music, with the development of what was in effect a national school of orchestral and operatic music in Scotland, with composers that included Alexander Mackenzie, William Wallace, Learmont Drysdale, Hamish MacCunn and John McEwen.

After World War II traditional music in Scotland was marginalised, but remained a living tradition. This marginal status was changed by individuals including Alan Lomax, Hamish Henderson and Peter Kennedy, through collecting, publications, recordings and radio programmes. Acts that were popularised included John Strachan, Jimmy MacBeath, Jeannie Robertson and Flora MacNeil. In the 1960s there was a flourishing folk club culture and Ewan MacColl emerged as a leading figure in the revival in Britain. They hosted traditional performers, including Donald Higgins and the Stewarts of Blairgowrie, beside English performers and new Scottish revivalists such as Robin Hall, Jimmie Macgregor, The Corries and the Ian Campbell Folk Group. There was also a strand of popular Scottish music that benefited from the arrival of radio and television, which relied on images of Scottishness derived from tartanry and stereotypes employed in music hall and variety. This was exemplified by the TV programme The White Heather Club which ran from 1958 to 1967, hosted by Andy Stewart and starring Moira Anderson and Kenneth McKellar.

The fusing of various styles of American music with British folk created a distinctive form of fingerstyle guitar playing known as folk baroque, pioneered by figures including Davey Graham and Bert Jansch. Others totally abandoned the traditional element including Donovan and The Incredible String Band, who have been seen as developing psychedelic folk. Acoustic groups who continued to interpret traditional material through into the 1970s included The Tannahill Weavers, Ossian, Silly Wizard, The Boys of the Lough, Battlefield Band, The Clutha and the Whistlebinkies.

Celtic rock developed as a variant of British folk rock by Scottish groups including the JSD Band and Spencer's Feat. Five Hand Reel, who combined Irish and Scottish personnel, emerged as the most successful exponents of the style. From the late 1970s the attendance at, and numbers of, folk clubs began to decrease, as new musical and social trends began to dominate. However, in Scotland the circuit of ceilidhs and festivals helped prop up traditional music. Two of the most successful groups of the 1980s that emerged from this dance band circuit were Runrig and Capercaillie. A by-product of the Celtic Diaspora was the existence of large communities across the world that looked for their cultural roots and identity to their origins in the Celtic nations. From the US this includes Scottish bands Seven Nations, Prydein and Flatfoot 56. From Canada are bands such as Enter the Haggis, Great Big Sea, The Real McKenzies and Spirit of the West.

Classical music

The development of a distinct tradition of art music in Scotland was limited by the impact of the Scottish Reformation on ecclesiastical music from the sixteenth century. Concerts, largely composed of "Scottish airs", developed in the seventeenth century and classical instruments were introduced to the country. Music in Edinburgh prospered through the patronage of figures including the merchant Sir John Clerk of Penicuik. The Italian style of classical music was probably first brought to Scotland by the cellist and composer Lorenzo Bocchi, who travelled to Scotland in the 1720s. The Musical Society of Edinburgh was incorporated in 1728. Several Italian musicians were active in the capital in this period and there are several known Scottish composers in the classical style, including Thomas Erskine, 6th Earl of Kellie, the first Scot known to have produced a symphony.

In the mid-eighteenth century a group of Scottish composers including James Oswald and William McGibbon created the "Scots drawing room style", taking primarily Lowland Scottish tunes and making them acceptable to a middle class audience. In the 1790s Robert Burns embarked on an attempt to produce a corpus of Scottish national song contributing about a third of the songs of The Scots Musical Museum. Burns also collaborated with George Thomson in A Select Collection of Original Scottish Airs, which adapted Scottish folk songs with "classical" arrangements. However, Burns' championing of Scottish music may have prevented the establishment of a tradition of European concert music in Scotland, which faltered towards the end of the eighteenth century.

From the mid-nineteenth century classical music began a revival in Scotland, aided by the visits of Chopin and Mendelssohn in the 1840s. By the late nineteenth century, there was in effect a national school of orchestral and operatic music in Scotland, with major composers including Alexander Mackenzie, William Wallace, Learmont Drysdale and Hamish MacCunn. Major performers included the pianist Frederic Lamond, and singers Mary Garden and Joseph Hislop.

After World War I, Robin Orr and Cedric Thorpe Davie were influenced by modernism and Scottish musical cadences. Erik Chisholm founded the Scottish Ballet Society and helped create several ballets. The Edinburgh Festival was founded in 1947 and led to an expansion of classical music in Scotland, leading to the foundation of Scottish Opera in 1960. Important post-war composers included Ronald Stevenson, Francis George Scott, Edward McGuire, William Sweeney, Iain Hamilton, Thomas Wilson, Thea Musgrave, Judith Weir, James MacMillan and Helen Grime. Craig Armstrong has produced music for numerous films. Major performers include the percussionist Evelyn Glennie. Major Scottish orchestras include: Royal Scottish National Orchestra (RSNO), the Scottish Chamber Orchestra (SCO) and the BBC Scottish Symphony Orchestra (BBC SSO). Major venues include Glasgow Royal Concert Hall, Usher Hall, Edinburgh and Queen's Hall, Edinburgh.

Pop, rock and fusion

Pop and rock were slow to get started in Scotland and produced few bands of note in the 1950s or 1960s, though thanks to accolades by David Bowie and others, the Edinburgh-based band 1-2-3 (later Clouds), active 1966–71, have belatedly been acknowledged as a definitive precursor of the progressive rock movement. However, by the 1970s bands such as the Average White Band, Nazareth, and The Sensational Alex Harvey Band began to have international success. However, the biggest Scottish pop act of the 1970s (at least in terms of sales) were undoubtedly the Bay City Rollers; a spinoff band formed by former Rollers members, Pilot, also enjoyed some success. Several members of the internationally successful rock band AC/DC were born in Scotland, including original lead singer Bon Scott and guitarists Malcolm and Angus Young, though by the time they began playing, all three had moved to Australia. George Young, Angus and Malcolm's older brother, found success as a member of the Australian band The Easybeats, later produced some of AC/DC's records and formed a songwriting partnership with Dutch expat Harry Vanda. Similarly Mark Knopfler and John Martyn were partly raised in Scotland.

During the 1960s, Scotland contributed two innovative rock musicians who were central to the international scene; folk/psychedelia guitarist/singer/songwriter Donovan (Donovan Phillips Leitch), and blues-rock/jazz-rock bassist/composer Jack Bruce (John Symon Asher Bruce). Traces of Scottish literary and musical influences can be found in both Donovan's and Bruce's work.

Donovan's music on 1965's Fairytale anticipated the British folk rock revival. Donovan pioneered psychedelic rock with Sunshine Superman in 1966. Donovan's decidedly Celtic rock directions can be found on his later albums like Open Road and HMS Donovan. Donovan is said to be an early influence and encouragement for Marc Bolan founder of T. Rex.

Jack Bruce co-founded Cream along with Eric Clapton and Ginger Baker in 1966, debuting with the album Fresh Cream. Fresh Cream and the launch of Cream are considered a pivotal moment in blues-rock history, introducing virtuosity and improvisation to the form. Bruce, as a member of The Tony Williams Lifetime (along with John McLaughlin and Larry Young) on Emergency!, similarly contributed to a seminal jazz-rock work that predated Bitches Brew by Miles Davis.

Scotland produced a few punk bands of note, such as The Exploited, The Rezillos, The Skids, The Fire Engines, and the Scars. However, it was not until the post-punk era of the early 1980s, that Scotland really came into its own, with bands like Cocteau Twins, Orange Juice, The Associates, Simple Minds, Maggie Reilly, Annie Lennox (Eurythmics), Hue and Cry, Goodbye Mr Mackenzie, The Jesus and Mary Chain, Wet Wet Wet, Big Country, The Proclaimers and Josef K. Since the 1980s Scotland has produced several popular rock and alternative rock acts.

Most recently, Scottish piping has included a renaissance for cauldwind pipes such as smallpipes and border pipes, which use cold, dry air as opposed to the moist air of mouth-blown pipes. Other pipers such as Gordon Duncan and Fred Morrison began to explore new musical genres on many kinds of pipes.  The accordion also gained in popularity during the 1970s due to the renown of Phil Cunningham, whose distinctive piano accordion style was an integral part of the band Silly Wizard. Numerous musicians continued to follow more traditional styles including Alex Beaton.

A more recent trend has been to fuse traditional Celtic with world music, rock and jazz (see Celtic fusion). This has been championed by musicians such as Shooglenifty, innovators of the house fusion acid croft, Peatbog Faeries, The Easy Club, jazz fusion bands, puirt à beul mouth musicians Talitha MacKenzie and Martin Swan, pioneering singers Savourna Stevenson and Christine Primrose. Other modern musicians include the late techno-piper Martyn Bennett (who used hip hop beats and sampling), Hamish Moore, Roger Ball, Hamish Stuart, Jim Diamond and Sheena Easton.

Scotland produced many indie bands in the 1980s, including Primal Scream, The Soup Dragons, The Jesus and Mary Chain, The Blue Nile, Teenage Fanclub, 18 Wheeler, The Pastels and BMX Bandits being some of the best examples. The following decade also saw a burgeoning scene in Glasgow, with the likes of The Almighty, Arab Strap, Belle and Sebastian, Camera Obscura, The Delgados, Bis and Mogwai.

The late 1990s and 2000s saw Scottish guitar bands continue to achieve critical or commercial success, examples include Franz Ferdinand, Frightened Rabbit, Biffy Clyro, Texas, Travis, KT Tunstall, Amy Macdonald, Paolo Nutini, The View, Idlewild, Shirley Manson of Garbage, Glasvegas, We Were Promised Jetpacks, The Fratellis, and Twin Atlantic. Scottish extreme metal bands include Man Must Die and Cerebral Bore. One of the most famous and successful electronic music producers, Calvin Harris, is also Scottish.   The Edinburgh-based group Young Fathers won the 2014 Mercury Prize for their album Dead.

Scottish musical acts to achieve international commercial success through the 2010s and 2020s include Susan Boyle, Lewis Capaldi, Nina Nesbitt and Chvrches. Susan Boyle achieved international success, particularly with her first two studio albums, topping both the UK Album Charts and the Billboard 200 chart in the United States.

Jazz
Scotland has a strong jazz tradition and has produced many world class musicians since the 1950s, notably Jimmy Deuchar, Bobby Wellins and Joe Temperley. A long-standing problem was the lack of opportunities within Scotland to play with international musicians. Since the 1970s this has been addressed by Edinburgh clubowner Bill Kyle (the JazzBar) and enthusiast-run organisations such as Platform and then Assembly Direct, which have provided improved performance opportunities.

Perhaps the best known contemporary Scottish jazz musician is Tommy Smith. Again, the Edinburgh Jazz and Blues Festival brings some of the best jazz musicians in the world to Scotland every year, although, increasingly, other cities (such as Glasgow and Dundee) also run international jazz festivals.

Instruments

Accordion

Though often derided as Scottish kitsch, the accordion has long been a part of Scottish music. Country dance bands, such as that led by the renowned Jimmy Shand, have helped to dispel this image.  In the early 20th century, the melodeon (a variety of diatonic button accordion) was popular among rural folk, and was part of the bothy band tradition.  More recently, performers like Phil Cunningham (of Silly Wizard) and Sandy Brechin have helped popularise the accordion in Scottish music.

Bagpipes

Though bagpipes are closely associated with Scotland by many outsiders, the instrument (or, more precisely, family of instruments) is found throughout large swathes of Europe, North Africa and South Asia.  The most common bagpipe heard in modern Scottish music is the Great Highland Bagpipe, which was spread by the Highland regiments of the British Army. Historically, numerous other bagpipes existed, and many of them have been recreated in the last half-century. Also during the 19th century bagpipes were played on ships sailing off to war to keep the men's hopes up and to bring good luck in the coming war.

The classical music of the Great Highland Bagpipe is called Pìobaireachd, which consists of a first movement called the urlar (in English, the 'ground' movement,) which establishes a theme. The theme is then developed in a series of movements, growing increasingly complex each time.  After the urlar there is usually a number of variations and doublings of the variations.  Then comes the taorluath movement and variation and the crunluath movement, continuing with the underlying theme.  This is usually followed by a variation of the crunluath, usually the crunluath a mach (other variations: crunluath breabach and crunluath fosgailte) ; the piece closes with a return to the urlar.

Bagpipe competitions are common in Scotland, for both solo pipers and pipe bands. Competitive solo piping is currently popular among many aspiring pipers, some of whom travel from as far as Australia to attend Scottish competitions. Other pipers have chosen to explore more creative usages of the instrument. Different types of bagpipes have also seen a resurgence since the 70s, as the historical border pipes and Scottish smallpipes have been resuscitated and now attract a thriving alternative piping community. Two of Scotland's most highly regarded pipers are Gordon Duncan and Fred Morrison.

The pipe band is another common format for highland piping, with top competitive bands including the Victoria Police Pipe Band from Australia (formerly), Northern Ireland's Field Marshal Montgomery, the Republic of Ireland's Laurence O'Toole pipe band, Canada's 78th Fraser Highlanders Pipe Band and Simon Fraser University Pipe Band, and Scottish bands like Shotts and Dykehead Pipe Band and Strathclyde Police Pipe Band. These bands, as well as many others, compete in numerous pipe band competitions, often the World Pipe Band Championships, and sometimes perform in public concerts.

Fiddle

Scottish traditional fiddling encompasses a number of regional styles, including the bagpipe-inflected west Highlands, the upbeat and lively style of Norse-influenced Shetland Islands and the Strathspey and slow airs of the North-East. The instrument arrived late in the 17th century, and is first mentioned in 1680 in a document from Newbattle Abbey in Midlothian, Lessones For Ye Violin.

In the 18th century, Scottish fiddling is said to have reached new heights. Fiddlers like William Marshall and Niel Gow were legends across Scotland, and the first collections of fiddle tunes were published in mid-century.  The most famous and useful of these collections was a series published by Nathaniel Gow, one of Niel's sons, and a fine fiddler and composer in his own right. Classical composers such as Charles McLean, James Oswald and William McGibbon used Scottish fiddling traditions in their Baroque compositions.

Scottish fiddling is most directly represented in North America in Cape Breton, Nova Scotia, an island on the east coast of Canada, which received some 25,000 emigrants from the Scottish Highlands during the Highland Clearances of 1780–1850.  Cape Breton musicians such as Natalie MacMaster, Ashley MacIsaac, and Jerry Holland have brought their music to a worldwide audience, building on the traditions of master fiddlers such as Buddy MacMaster and Winston Scotty Fitzgerald.

Among native Scots, Aly Bain and Alasdair Fraser are two of the most accomplished, following in the footsteps of influential 20th-century players such as James Scott Skinner, Hector MacAndrew, Angus Grant and Tom Anderson.  The growing number of young professional Scottish fiddlers makes a complete list impossible.

The Annual Scots Fiddle Festival which runs each November showcases the great fiddling tradition and talent in Scotland.

Guitar

The history of the guitar in traditional music is recent, as is that of the cittern and bouzouki introduced into Celtic folk music by folksinger Johnny Moynihan in the late 1960s. The guitar featured prominently in the folk revival of the early 1960s with the likes of Archie Fisher, the Corries, Hamish Imlach, Robin Hall and Jimmie Macgregor. The virtuoso playing of Bert Jansch was widely influential, and the range of instruments was widened by The Incredible String Band. Notable artists include Tony McManus, Dave MacIsaac, Peerie Willie Johnson and Dick Gaughan. Other notable guitarists in Scottish music scene include Kris Drever of Fine Friday and Lau, and Ross Martin of Cliar, Dàimh and Harem Scarem. Scotland has also produced several notable electric guitarists, including Stuart Adamson of Big Country (once referred to as "Britain's Jimi Hendrix"), Angus Young of AC/DC, Jimmy McCulloch of Wings, Manny Charlton of Nazareth, Zal Cleminson of The Sensational Alex Harvey band, and Brian Robertson of Thin Lizzy.

Stringed instruments similar to that of modern guitars have appeared in Scottish folk music for centuries. 
The Gittern, an ancestor to the modern guitar, featured in medieval Scottish appearing from at least the 13th century and was still around in Scotland 300 years later.

Harp

Material evidence suggests that lyres and/or harp, or clarsach, has a long and ancient history in Britain, with Iron Age lyres dating from 2300BC. The harp was regarded as the national instrument until it was replaced with the Highland bagpipes in the 15th century. Stone carvings in the East of Scotland support the theory that the harp was present in Pictish Scotland well before the 9th century and may have been the original ancestor of the modern European harp and even formed the basis for Scottish pibroch, the folk bagpipe tradition.

Barring illustrations of harps in the 9th century Utrecht psalter, only thirteen depictions exist in Europe of any triangular chordophone harp pre-11th century, and all thirteen of them come from Scotland. Pictish harps were strung from horsehair. The instruments apparently spread south to the Anglo-Saxons, who commonly used gut strings, and then west to the Gaels of the Highlands and Ireland. The earliest Irish word for a harp is in fact Cruit, a word which strongly suggests a Pictish provenance for the instrument. The surname MacWhirter, Mac a' Chruiteir, means son of the harpist, and is common throughout Scotland, but particularly in Carrick and Galloway.

The Clàrsach (Gd.) or Cláirseach (Ga.) is the name given to the wire-strung harp of either Scotland or Ireland. The word begins to appear by the end of the 14th century. Until the end of the Middle Ages it was the most popular musical instrument in Scotland, and harpers were among the most prestigious cultural figures in the courts of Irish/Scottish chieftains and Scottish kings and earls. In both countries, harpers enjoyed special rights and played a crucial part in ceremonial occasions such as coronations and poetic bardic recitals. The Kings of Scotland employed harpers until the end of the Middle Ages, and they feature prominently in royal iconography. Several Clarsach players were noted at the Battle of the Standard (1138), and when Alexander III (died 1286) visited London in 1278, his court minstrels with him, records show payments were made to one Elyas, "King of Scotland's harper." One of the nicknames for the Scottish harp is "taigh nan teud", the house of strings.

Three medieval Gaelic harps survived into the modern period, two from Scotland (the Queen Mary Harp and the Lamont Harp) and one in Ireland (the Brian Boru harp), although artistic evidence suggests that all three were probably made in the western Highlands.

The playing of this Gaelic harp with wire strings died out in Scotland in the 18th century and in Ireland in the early 19th century. As part of the late 19th century Gaelic revival, the instruments used differed greatly from the old wire-strung harps. The new instruments had gut strings, and their construction and playing style was based on the larger orchestral pedal harp. Nonetheless, the name "clàrsach" was and is still used in Scotland today to describe these new instruments. The modern gut-strung clàrsach has thousands of players, both in Scotland and Ireland, as well as North America and elsewhere. The 1931 formation of the Clarsach Society kickstarted the modern harp renaissance. Recent harp players include Savourna Stevenson, Maggie MacInnes, and the band Sileas. Notable events include the annual Edinburgh International Harp Festival, which in 2006 staged the world record for the largest number of harpists to play at the same time.

Tin whistle

One of the oldest tin whistles still in existence is the Tusculum whistle, found with pottery dating to the 14th and 15th centuries; it is currently in the collection of the Museum of Scotland. Today the whistle is a very common instrument in recorded Scottish music. Although few well-known performers choose the tin whistle as their principal instrument, it is quite common for pipers, flute players, and other musicians to play the whistle as well.

Bodhrán

The Irish word bodhrán (plural bodhráin), indicating a drum, is first mentioned in a translated English document from Irish in the 17th century. The bodhrán originated in south-west Ireland probably in the 18th century, known as the "poor man's tambourine" – made from farm implements and without the cymbals, it was popular among mummers, or wren boys. A large oil painting by Irish artist Daniel Maclise (1806–1870) depicts a large Halloween house party in which a bodhrán features clearly. The bodhrán in Scotland and also Cape Breton, North mainland Nova Scotia, Newfoundland, and Prince Edward Island is an import from Ireland due to its popularity in 1960s because of the music of Seán Ó Riada

Samples
 of "Na cuperean", a traditional Scottish song from Nova Scotians in California from the Library of Congress' California Gold: Northern California Folk Music from the Thirties Collection; performed by Mary A. McDonald on 11 April 1939 in Berkeley, California

See also
 Music schools in Scotland
 Royal Conservatoire of Scotland
 List of pipe bands
 Gaelic music
 Music of Ireland
 Music of Wales
 Scottish Gaelic punk
 Scottish hip-hop

References

Notes

Further reading
Emmerson, George S. Rantin' Pipe and Tremblin' String – history of Scottish dance music. Second edition 1988. Galt House, London, Ontario, Canada. 
Eydmann, Stuart "The concertina as an emblem of the folk music revival in the British Isles." 1995. British Journal of Ethnomusicology 4: 41–49.
Eydmann, Stuart "As Common as Blackberries: The First Hundred Years of the Accordion in Scotland." 1999. Folk Music Journal 7 No. 5 pp. 565–608.
Eydmann, Stuart "From the "Wee Melodeon" to the "Big Box": The Accordion in Scotland since 1945." The Accordion in all its Guises, 2001. Musical Performance Volume 3 Parts 2 – 4 pp. 107–125.
Eydmann, Stuart The Life and Times of the Concertina: the adoption and usage of a novel musical instrument with particular reference to Scotland. PhD Thesis, The Open University 1995 published online at www.concertina.com/eydmann Stuart Eydmann: The Scottish Concertina
Hardie, Alastair J. The Caledonian Companion – A Collection of Scottish Fiddle Music and Guide to its Performance. 1992. The Hardie Press, Edinburgh. 
Heywood, Pete and Colin Irwin. "From Strathspeys to Acid Croft". 2000.  In Broughton, Simon and Ellingham, Mark with McConnachie, James and Duane, Orla (Ed.), World Music, Vol. 1: Africa, Europe and the Middle East, pp 261–272. Rough Guides Ltd, Penguin Books. 
Gilchrist, Jim.  "Scotland". 2001.  In Mathieson, Kenny (Ed.), Celtic music, pp. 54–87.  Backbeat Books.

External links
Five Centuries of Scottish Music a high-quality, free digital resource hosted by AHDS Performing Arts.
BBC Radio Scotland online radio: folk music on Travelling Folk, bagpipe music on Pipeline, country dance music on Reel Blend and Take the Floor. (RealPlayer plugin required)
Scottish Music Centre music archive and information resource.
Gaelic Modes Web articles on Gaelic harp harmony & modes